This is a list of earthquakes in Colombia. Colombia is a seismically active country and has a large seismic risk in many areas of its territory due to its location at the boundaries of the Malpelo, Panama, Caribbean, North Andes (where most earthquakes occurred) and South American Plates along the Pacific Ring of Fire. The southeastern and extreme eastern portions of Colombia are not as seismically active as the rest of the country.

The first historically registered earthquake felt in Colombia occurred on September 11, 1530, around 10:00 AM, probably with the epicentre near Cumaná, Venezuela. The earthquake was documented by Gonzalo Fernández de Oviedo y Valdés in his work La Historia general de las Indias and by friar Bartolomé de las Casas in his book Historia de Las Indias. The first documented earthquake with its epicentre in present-day Colombia territory took place in 1566, with the epicentre estimated around Santander in the department of Cauca. Other important historical earthquakes have been documented by Luis Vargas Jurado, from 1703 until 1764 and Santiago Pérez Valencia between 1785 and 1843.

The most devastating earthquake for Colombia happened on August 15 and 16, 1868 off the coast of Ecuador, leading to approximately 70,000 fatalities. The strongest earthquake, with an estimated moment magnitude of 8.8 also happened offshore Ecuador in 1906. Other major earthquakes were the 1875 Cúcuta earthquake with around 10,000 deaths and the 1999 Armenia earthquake with an intensity of X. The deepest registered earthquake happened in the department of Amazonas in 1970 at an estimated depth of almost . The 1785 Viceroyalty of New Granada earthquake sparked the birth of journalism in Colombia, initiated by Manuel del Socorro Rodríguez, six years after the publication of the Aviso del Terremoto about the earthquake with its epicentre in La Calera, Cundinamarca.

The main seismically active zone is the subduction zone of the Malpelo, formerly Nazca, Plate with strong earthquakes in 1906, 1947, 1958 and 1979. Other strong earthquakes are associated with the Murindó (Mw 7.2, 1992), Irlanda (Mw 6.8, 1994), Tucurá (Mw 6.7, 1952), Bahía Solano (Mw 6.5, 1970), and Mutatá Faults (Mw 6.0, 2016).



Major historical earthquakes 
Note: out of many, only earthquakes of Mw 6.0 and higher, deadly, important historical, and unusual earthquakes are included in this list
Magnitudes - Mw Moment magnitude scale, ML Richter magnitude scale, Ms Surface wave magnitude, ? Unknown scale

See also 

 Geology of Colombia
 Lists of earthquakes
 List of earthquakes in Ecuador
 List of earthquakes in Panama
 List of earthquakes in Peru
 List of earthquakes in Venezuela
 List of volcanoes in Colombia

Notes and references

Notes

References

Bibliography

Further reading

External links 

  Red Sismológica Nacional de Colombia

Earthquakes
Colombia

Earthquakes